Darwinia whicherensis, commonly known as the Abba bell, is a plant in the myrtle family Myrtaceae and is endemic to the south-west of Western Australia. It is a small shrub with linear leaves and bell-shaped, flower-like inflorescences containing more than twenty flowers surrounded by bracts, the largest of which are red with green edges.

Description
The inflorescences are bell-shaped and hang down.

Taxonomy and naming
Darwinia whicherensis was first formally described in 2009 by Greg Keighery from a specimen collected from the base of the Whicher Range escarpment and the description was published in Nuytsia. The specific epithet (whicherensis) refers to the location where the type specimen was found.

Distribution and habitat
It grows on shallow sandy clay in winter-wet flats in Dryandra squarrosa shrubland.

Conservation
Darwinia whicherensis is classified as "Threatened Flora (Declared Rare Flora — Extant)" by the Western Australian Government Department of Parks and Wildlife under Western Australia's Wildlife Conservation Act 1950 and as "Endangered" (EN) under the Australian Government Environment Protection and Biodiversity Conservation Act 1999 (EPBC Act) as a result of having a single wild population comprising a very low number of mature individuals and the restricted area of occupancy of the species. The principal threats to the species are fire and disease caused by Phytophthora cinnamomi and Armillaria luteobubalina.

References

 

whicherensis
Endemic flora of Western Australia
Rosids of Western Australia
Myrtales of Australia
Plants described in 2009
Taxa named by Gregory John Keighery